The Berkeley school of political theory is a school of thought in political theory associated originally with the work of faculty at the University of California, Berkeley, some of whom formulated and popularized its ideas. The school of thought was founded by Sheldon Wolin, Hanna Pitkin,  Michael Rogin, John Schaar, and Norman Jacobson, among others, and has been carried on by theorists including Wilson Carey McWilliams, Mary G. Dietz, Linda M.G. Zerilli and J. Peter Euben.

The Berkeley school has been characterized as returning political theory back in the direction of politics and political action, and away from efforts to center "scientific" models such as economics, psychology, sociology, and the natural sciences, specifically behavioralism and evolutionary psychology.

See also 
 D.P. Mathiowetz, "The Berkeley School of Political Theory as Moment and as Tradition", PS: Political Science and Politics, June 1, 2017, available at http://escholarship.org/uc/item/3n9196dc.
 James P. Young, Reconsidering American Liberalism: The Troubled Odyssey of the Liberal Idea (Boulder: Westview Press, 1996), 294–306.
 Jason Reiner, "The Berkeley School of Political Theory: A Retrospective on an American Radicalism," Association for Political Theory 2013 Annual Meeting
 D. P. Mathiowetz, 2016, "Hanna Fenichel Pitkin and the Dilemmas of Political Thinking", in Hanna Fenichel Pitkin: Politics, Judgement, Action, available at http://escholarship.org/uc/item/1x84g1jx .

References

Political theories
Schools of thought